The Chinese Futsal League (CFL) is the top league for futsal in China. The winning team obtains the participation right to the AFC Futsal Club Championship.

History

External links
Chinafutsal.sports.cn
Futsalplanet.com

Futsal competitions in China
China
Futsal
Sports leagues in China
Professional sports leagues in China